Michael Driscoll may refer to:
Michael Patrick Driscoll (1939–2017), Roman Catholic bishop of Boise
Michael Driscoll (economist) (born 1950), English economist and university administrator
Michael E. Driscoll (1851–1929), U.S. Representative from New York
Michael Driscoll (baseball) (1892–1953), American baseball pitcher
Michael Driscoll (Pennsylvania politician) (born 1960), member of the Pennsylvania House of Representatives